Steve Stapler (born June 28, 1958) is a former Canadian football wide receiver in the Canadian Football League (CFL). He played for the Toronto Argonauts and Hamilton Tiger-Cats, appearing in the Grey Cup final with the Ti-Cats in 1984, 1985, and winning in 1986. Stapler played college football at San Diego State.

References

1958 births
Living people
Players of American football from Los Angeles
American players of Canadian football
American football wide receivers
Canadian football wide receivers
San Diego State Aztecs football players
Toronto Argonauts players
Hamilton Tiger-Cats players
Players of Canadian football from Los Angeles